Youssef Mohammed Karam Taher (born 15 July 1993) is a Kuwaiti sprinter specialising in the 400 metres and 400 metres hurdles. He represented his country at the 2018 World Indoor Championships reaching the semifinals.

International competitions

1Did not finish in the semifinals

Personal bests
Outdoor
400 metres – 46.27 (Doha 2015)	
800 metres – 1:54.14 (Kuwait City 2015)
400 metres hurdles – 50.90 (Bhubaneshwar 2017)
Indoor
400 metres – 46.66 (Tehran 2018)

References

1993 births
Living people
Kuwaiti male sprinters
Kuwaiti male hurdlers
Athletes (track and field) at the 2014 Asian Games
Asian Games competitors for Kuwait
Asian Athletics Championships winners